A bocal is a curved, tapered tube, which is an integral part of certain woodwind instruments, including double reed instruments such as the bassoon, contrabassoon, English horn, and oboe d'amore, as well as the larger recorders. In the double reed instruments, the bocal connects the reed to the rest of the instrument; in the case of larger recorders, the bocal directs air from the player's mouth to the fipple. Bocals can be made from a variety of metals, including nickel silver, brass, sterling silver, or even gold, and are covered at the lower end with a cork sleeve, allowing the bocal to fit tightly in the socket at the top of the instrument. More recently, at least one maker is producing bocals made of hardwood. The reed either fits directly on to the tapered end of the bocal (as with the bassoon) or is tied to a metal tube which fits to the bocal (as with the English horn).

See also
 Leadpipe

Sources

Woodwind instrument parts and accessories